The Women's Basketball Hall of Fame honors those who have contributed to the sport of women's basketball.  The Hall of Fame opened in 1999 in Knoxville, Tennessee, USA.  It is the only facility of its kind dedicated to all levels of women's basketball.  Knoxville is known for having a large women's basketball following as well as being the home of the University of Tennessee's Lady Vols basketball team previously coached by women's coach Pat Summitt, who was part of the first class inducted.  With the 2017 Induction, the Women's Basketball Hall of Fame celebrated its 19th anniversary and added six new members to its hall, honoring 157 inductees.

Inductees may be nominated in the following categories: Coach, Veteran Coach, Player, International Player, Veteran Player, Contributor,  and Official.

Highlights

Women's Basketball Hall of Fame campus
The Women's Basketball Hall of Fame is home to the world's largest basketball sitting on the north rotunda of the hall, measuring 30 feet tall and weighing 10 tons.

The WBHOF Basketball Courts in the north rotunda of the hall allow one to test one's basketball skills on three different courts representing the hall's mission statement of "honoring the past, celebrating the present, and promoting the future" of women's basketball.  The courts also are home to a timed dribbling course and a passing skills area.  There is also a photo area where you can pretend to be players from different eras in history.

Pat Summitt
Pat Summitt Rotunda is located at the entrance of the WBHOF.  This area remembers founding board member and Class of 1999 inductee Pat Summitt.

The courtyard outside of the Pat Summitt Rotunda is shaped like a basketball and is made of numerous bricks with personalized inscriptions. Many of the bricks are engraved to honor guests, inductees and a host of other who have chosen to leave their legacy at the hall of fame.

Hall of Honor
The Hall of Honor is the location within the Hall of Fame that recognizes the achievements of each of the inductees.

Eastman Statue
The Eastman Statue, sculpted by Elizabeth MacQueen, is erected at the entrance to the Women's Basketball Hall of Fame.  This 17-foot-tall bronze statue exemplifies Women's Basketball Hall of Fame's mission to "honor the past, celebrate the present and promote the future" of women's basketball. Each year, the Women's Basketball Hall of Fame presents its current class of Inductees with a replica of the Eastman statue, known as the "Eastman".

Trailblazers of the Game

All American Red Heads
The All American Red Heads played for 50 years, from 1936 to 1986 which is still the longest running women's professional team.  The Red Heads were founded by Mr. and Mrs.C. M. Olson in Cassville, Missouri.  C. M. Olson was the former coach-owner of a male exhibition basketball team called Olson's Terrible Swedes.  Known for their on-court antics, this inspired C. M. Olson's wife, Doyle, and the women who worked in her beauty salons to form a professional basketball exhibition team. In 1954, Coach Orwell Moore and his wife Lorene "Butch" Moore bought the Red heads and moved the team to Caraway, Arkansas. Lorene Moore played on the team for eleven years, scoring 35,426 points during her career. The Red Heads were so popular that during the years 1964-1971 there may have been as many as three Red Head teams traveling the country. In 1972, the Red Heads won 500 out of 642 games played against men's team. Throughout the years the All American Red Heads played in all 50 states as well as Mexico, Canada, and the Philippines. The team has been featured in national magazines such as Life, Look, Sports Illustrated and Women's Sports, and they were widely considered as the greatest women's basketball team in the world. Coach Moore retired and disbanded the Red Heads in 1986 after 50 years of play The All American Red Heads still have annual reunions today.

Edmonton Commercial Graduates Basketball Club
The Edmonton Commercial Graduates Basketball Club was founded in 1915 by John Percy Page. The origins of the club can be traced to the McDougall Commercial Girls High School Basketball team in Edmonton, Canada. When team members graduated high school, they convinced coach John Percy Page to continue the team as a Club sport. Membership with the Club was exclusive, only 38 women ever wore the Grad jersey. Winnie Martin (Tait) was the First Captain of the Edmonton Grads, playing from 1915-1924. The Grads played 522 games officially in Canada, the United States and Europe. The Club tallied a 502-20 record in 25 years of play The Edmonton Commercial Graduates are widely considered the greatest women's team ever assembled. Financially restrained, members often chipped in to raise funds for national play. Their strong dedication to the game and will to persevere in a time when women's basketball was largely ignored makes the Edmonton Grads praiseworthy John Percy Page coached the club to 18 Canadian Championships The Club attended four sets of Olympic Games: Paris in 1924, Amsterdam in 1928, Los Angeles in 1932, and Berlin in 1936 where they received 4 unofficial Olympic titles The Club played its last game on June 5, 1940, defeating a Chicago team 62-52 Dr. James A. Naismith was quoted to say, "There is no team that I mention more frequently in talking about the game. My admiration is not only for your remarkable record of games won (which itself would make you stand out in the history of basketball) but also for your record of clean play, versatility in meeting teams at their own style, and more especially for your unbroken record of good sportsmanship."

Wayland Baptist Flying Queens
Claude Hutcherson, a Wayland graduate and owner of Hutcherson Air Service, provided air transportation for the Queens to games in Mexico in 1948. That encounter blossomed into a full sponsorship of the team in 1950, a change that brought with it a new mascot - the Hutcherson Flying Queens. Five decades later, Wayland is still atop the world of women's basketball for they still remain the only women's team in history to win 1,300 games. Long before Connecticut became a dominant power in women's basketball, the Flying Queens of Wayland Baptist thrived on innovation, talent and glamour, playing on athletic scholarships, traveling by private planes, warming up with ostentatious drills learned from the Harlem Globetrotters and winning every game for nearly five seasons. The Wayland Baptist University women's team achieved a 131-game winning streak from November 1953 to March 1958 before losing 46-42 to Nashville Business School. During that time the Flying Queens captured four consecutive AAU national championships.

Mighty Macs
The 1972-74 Mighty Macs team captured the first three Association for Intercollegiate Athletics for Women (AIAW) championships. Immaculata is considered the birthplace of modern college women's basketball. In addition, to winning the first three college national championships, the Mighty Macs were the first women's team along with the University of Maryland to appear on National television. They were also the first women's team, along with Queen's College, to play at Madison Square Garden. Their inspirational story was made into a feature-length theatrical movie called The Mighty Macs and released by Sony Pictures in 2011. The 1972-74 teams have produced 3 Women's Basketball Hall of Fame Inductees. Listed are the individuals associated with the three teams; Janet Ruch Boltz, Denise Conway Crawford, Janet Young Eline, Theresa Shank Grentz (Class of 2001), Barbara Deuble Kelly, Tina Krah, Patricia Mulhern Loughran, Judy Marra Martelli, Sue Forsyth O'Grady, Rene Muth Portland, Betty Ann Hoffman Quinn, Cathy Rush (Class of 2000), Mary Scharff, Marianne Crawford Stanley (Class of 2002), Maureen Stuhlman, and Marie Liguori Williams.

Delta State teams
The 1975, 1976, and 1977 Delta State teams captured three consecutive AIAW championships. After finishing 16–2 in the 1973-74 revival season following a 40-year layoff of the women's basketball program, Delta State proceeded to end Immaculata College's three-year AIAW national championship reign in season No. 2 by going undefeated at 28-0. Delta State followed its first AIAW national crown by also winning the next two as the Lady Statesmen defeated Immaculata (69-64) at Penn State and then LSU (68-55) at Minnesota. During their three championship years, Delta State compiled a 93-4 record (28-0, 33-1, 32-3), including a then-record 51 straight wins. The 1975-77 teams have produced 2 Women's Basketball Hall of Fame inductees, Margaret Wade and Lusia Harris Stewart. The WBCA Wade Trophy, considered the Heisman of women's basketball, is named in honor of Lily Margaret Wade. Listed are the individuals associated with the three teams: Angel Fortenberry, Ann Logue, Beth Trussell, Cornelia Ward, Debbie Brock, Jackie Caston, Janie Evans, Jill Rhodes, Judy Davis, Kathy Lewis, Key Crump, Laurie Ann Harper, Lusia Harris Stewart (Class of 1999), Lynn Adubato, Mandy Fortenberyy, Margaret Wade (Class of 1999), Mary Logue, Melissa Thames, Melissa Ward, Mimi Williams, Pam Piazza, Romona Von Boeckman, Sheri Haynes, Tish Fahey, Virginia Shackelford, and Wanda Hairston.

USA Women's Basketball teams
The 1976 USA Women's Basketball team captured the United States' first medal in Olympic women's basketball history winning the silver medal. The USA's silver medal finish served a notice to the rest of the world that the United States would be a force in Olympic women's basketball. Since the 1976 Olympics, the USA Women's Basketball Teams have compiled a record of 55 and 1 and captured 7 gold medals and 1 bronze in Olympic play. The 1976 USA Olympic Women's Basketball Team paved the way for United States dominance. The 1976 team has produced 11 Women's Basketball Hall of Fame Inductees. Ann Meyers Drysdale (Class of 1999), Nancy Lieberman (Class of 1999), Billie Moore (Class of 1999), Pat Summitt (Class of 1999), Mary Anne O'Conner, Lusia Harris Stewart (Class of 1999), Gail Marquis, Nancy Dunkle (Class of 2000), Sue Gunter (Class of 2000), Patricia Roberts (Class of 2000), Sue Rojcewicz (Class of 2000), Charlotte Lewis, Juliene Simpson (Class of 2000), Cindy Brogdon (Class of 2002), Jeanne Rowlands, Gail Weldon.

The 1996 USA Olympic Basketball Team dominated its competition to reclaim the Olympic gold medal in Atlanta. Rolling to an 8-0 Olympic mark, the USA, which began training on October 2, 1995, compiled a 52-0 record during its pre-Olympic competition to finish with an overall 60-0 record. More popular than any previous women's basketball team, the USA drew a record 202,556 fans during the Olympics for an average of 25,320 a game. The 1996 Olympic Team includes 10 Women's Basketball Hall of Fame Inductees. Jennifer Azzi (Class of 2009), Ruthie Bolton (Class of 2011), Teresa Edwards (Class of 2010), Venus Lacey, Lisa Leslie (Class of 2015), Rebecca Lobo (Class of 2010), Katrina McClain (Class of 2006), Nikki McCray (Class of 2012), Carla McGhee, Dawn Staley (Class of 2012), Katy Steding, Sheryl Swoopes (Class of 2017), Tara VanDerveer (Class of 2002), Ceal Barry, Nancy Darsch, Marian Washington (Class of 2004), Bruce Moseley, Gina Konin Larence

Helm Foundation
The Helms Foundation was established in 1936 and created by Bill Schroeder and Paul Helms to select national championship teams and All-American teams in a number of college sports, including women's basketball. The Panel met annually to vote on a National Champion and retroactively ranked basketball back to 1901. When Paul Helms died in 1957, United Savings and Loan became the Helms Foundation's benefactor and eventually became known as the Citizens Savings Athletic Foundation. The Foundation officially dissolved in 1982. Thirteen Helms Foundation members are also Women's Basketball Hall of Fame Inductees: Alline Banks (Sprouse), Joan Crawford, Lyrlyne Greer, Rita Horkey, Doris Rogers, Margaret Sexton, Hazel Walker, Katherine Washington, Nera White, John Head, Claude Hutcherson, Harley Redin, and Lometa Odom.

Inductees

Class of 1999

 Senda Abbott
 Lidia Alexeyeva
 Carol Blazejowski
 Joanne Bracker
 Jody Conradt
 Joan Crawford
 Denise Curry
 Anne Donovan
 Carol Eckman
 Betty Jo Graber
 Lusia Harris-Stewart
 John Head
 Nancy Lieberman
 Darlene May
 Ann Meyers-Drysdale
 Cheryl Miller
 Billie Moore
 Shin-Ja Park
 Harley Redin
 Uljana Semjonova
 Jim Smiddy
 Pat Head Summitt
 Bertha Teague
 Margaret Wade
 Nera White

Class of 2000

 Alline Banks Sprouse
 Mildred Barnes
 Barbara "Breezy" Bishop
 E. Wayne Cooley
 Nancy Dunkle
 Olga Sukharnova
 Borislav Stankovic
 Fran Garmon
 Dorothy Gaters
 Sue Gunter
 Rita Horky
 Betty Jaynes
 George E. Killian
 Kim Mulkey-Robertson
 Cindy Noble Hauserman
 Lorene Ramsey
 Patricia (Trish) Roberts
 Sue Rojcewicz
 Cathy Rush
 Juliene Brazinski Simpson
 Katherine Washington
 Dean Weese
 Marcy Weston
 Kay Yow

Class of 2001

 Van Chancellor
 Theresa Grentz
 Phyllis Holmes
 LaTaunya Pollard
 Linda K. Sharp
 C. Vivian Stringer
 Vanya Voynova
 Hazel Walker
 Rosie Walker
 Holly Warlick

Class of 2002

 Cindy Brogdon
 Hortência Marcari
 Kamie Ethridge
 Margaret Sexton Gleaves
 Sandra Meadows
 Lea Plarski
 Marianne Crawford Stanley
 Tara VanDerveer

Class of 2003

 Leon Barmore
 Tara Heiss
 Claude Hutcherson
 Patsy Neal 
 Doris Rogers 
 Marsha Sharp

Class of 2004

 Sylvia Hatchell
 Lurlyne Greer Rogers
 Amy Ruley
 Bev Smith
 Bill Wall
 Marian E. Washington

Class of 2005

 Joe Ciampi
 Kelli Litsch
 Hunter Low
 Edna Tarbutton
 Dixie Woodall
 Lynette Woodard

Class of 2006

 Geno Auriemma
 Maria Paula Gonçalves da Silva
 Clarissa Davis-Wrightsil
 Janice Lawrence Braxton
 Katrina McClain Johnson
 Barbara Stevens

Class of 2007

 Daedra Charles-Furlow
 Bridgette Gordon
 Mel Greenberg
 Pamela Kelly-Flowers
 Andy Landers
 Andrea Lloyd-Curry

Class of 2008

 Debbie Ryan
 Patty Broderick
 Lin L. Laursen
 Jill Rankin Schneider
 Suzie McConnell-Serio
 Michelle Timms

Class of 2009

 Jennifer Azzi
 Cynthia Cooper
 Jennifer Gillom
 Sonja Hogg
 Jill Hutchison
 Ora Washington

Class of 2010

 Leta Andrews
 Teresa Edwards
 Rebecca Lobo
 Gloria Ray
 Teresa Weatherspoon
 Chris Weller

Class of 2011

 Val Ackerman
 Ruthie Bolton
 Vicky Bullett
 Muffet McGraw
 Pearl Moore
 Lometa Odom

Class of 2012

 Nancy Fahey
 Nikki McCray
 Pamela McGee
 Inge Nissen
 Robin Roberts
 Dawn Staley

Class of 2013

 Gary Blair
 Jim Foster
 Peggie Gillom-Granderson
 Jennifer Rizzotti
 Annette Smith-Knight
 Sue Wicks

Class of 2014

 Lin Dunn
 Michelle Edwards
 Mimi Griffin
 Yolanda Griffith
 Jasmina Perazić
 Charlotte West

Class of 2015

 Janeth Arcain
 Kurt Budke
 Gail Goestenkors
 Janet Harris
 Lisa Leslie
 Brad Smith

Class of 2016

 Sherri Coale
 June Courteau
 Joe Lombard
 Jackie Stiles
 Bill F. Tipps
 Natalie Williams

Class of 2017

 Sally Bell
 Christine Grant
 Rick Insell
 Louise O'Neal
 Sheryl Swoopes
 Kara Wolters

Class of 2018

 Ceal Barry
 Rose Marie Battaglia
 Chris Dailey
 Mickie DeMoss
 Chamique Holdsclaw
 Katie Smith
 Tina Thompson

Class of 2019

 Beth Bass
 Carolyn Bush Roddy
 Joan Cronan
 Nora Lynn Finch
 Ticha Penicheiro
 Ruth Riley
 Valerie Still

Class of 2021

 Debbie Brock
 Carol Callan
 Swin Cash
 Tamika Catchings
 Sue Donohoe
 Lauren Jackson
 Carol Stiff
 David Stern

Class of 2022

 Debbie Antonelli
 Alice “Cookie” Barron
 Doug Bruno
 Becky Hammon
 DeLisha Milton-Jones
 Paul Sanderford
 Bob Schneider
 Penny Taylor

See also
 List of sports awards honoring women
 List of members of the Naismith Memorial Basketball Hall of Fame
 List of players in the Naismith Memorial Basketball Hall of Fame
 List of coaches in the Naismith Memorial Basketball Hall of Fame
 FIBA Hall of Fame
 List of members of the FIBA Hall of Fame
 International Women's Sports Hall of Fame
 Women's Basketball Coaches Association

References

External links
 Women's Basketball Hall of Fame
 Women's Basketball Hall of Fame Guide (including player and coach biographies)

Basketball museums and halls of fame
Halls of fame in Tennessee
History of women in Tennessee
Hall
Women's museums in the United States
Sports museums in Tennessee
Museums in Knoxville, Tennessee
Sports in Knoxville, Tennessee
Women's halls of fame
Sports awards honoring women
Awards established in 1999
1999 establishments in Tennessee
Basketball in Tennessee